Budhanilkantha Temple, located in Budhanilkantha, Nepal,  (translation: Old Blue Throat) is a Hindu open air temple dedicated to Lord Mahavishnu. Budhanilkantha Temple is also known as the Narayanthan Temple, and can be identified by a large reclining statue of Lord Mahavishnu.

Religious Significance 
Some people associate Budhanilkanth's name with Gautama Buddha since it pronunciation being closely similar but this is not a correct fact. Though the temple is named Budhanilkantha, its name does not come from the Buddha; Budhanilkantha instead has a Sanskrit origin that means ‘Old Blue Throat’, a title of Lord Shiva that was given by gods after the Lord drank poison to save the world. The statue symbolizes Lord Vishnu, who is regarded as one of the 'Trimurtis', along with Brahma and Shiva.  The Hindu scriptures Bhagavata Purana, Vishnu Purana and the epics Ramayana and Mahabharata refer to Samudra manthan, which is directly related to the origin of Gosaikunda. According to legend the spring that feeds the pond in the Budanilkantha temple is connected to Gosaikunda which makes it to have a direct connection to the water source from Lord Shiva.  This is the reason why its name is dedicated to Lord Shiva  even though the statue is dedicated to Lord Vishnu  since the water pond on which the statue lies, has its source to Gosaikunda dedicated to Lord Shiva which was the result of him drinking the poison and storing it in his throat resulting in him having blue throat.

This temple is regarded as a sacred place for Hindus but is equally well venerated by Buddhists (who consider the murti to be Buddha).  It is considered as a sign of religious harmony that has existed in the region since ancient times .

Location 

Budhanilkantha Temple is situated below the Shivapuri Hill at the northern end of the Kathmandu valley. It is located in Budhanilkantha municipality of Kathmandu District. Its address is Golfutar Main Rd, Budhanilkantha 44600. The Budhanilkantha Temple is about 10 kilometres from Tribhuvan International Airport and is about 9 kilometres from Thamel.

Feature

The main statue is carved up on a single block black basalt stone. The statue stands 5 meters tall (around 16.4 feet) and is positioned in the middle of a recessed pool of water, which is 13 meters (42.65 feet) long. He holds the Sudarshana Chakra, Club, a Conch Shell and a gem in his four hands. He is well adorned with a crown engraved with multiple Kirtimukha images which can often be seen being overlapped by a silver crown. The statue is believed to be more than 1400 years old. The temple's main statue of Budhanilkantha is considered the largest stone carving in Nepal.

Festivals
The Budhanilkantha Temple has become the site where thousands of pilgrims visit when Haribondhini Ekadashi Mela takes place on the 11th day of the Hindu month of Kartika (October–November) every year. This is a special ritual to wake up Lord Vishnu from his long sleep. A big fair is also held at the temple area every year on the auspicious occasions such as Ekadashis, Harishayani and Haribodhini of hindu lunar calendar which marks the 4-month sleeping period of Lord Vishnu.

The Mysteries surrounding the temple

The Legend of the Nepalese Monarchy 

A legend states that King Pratap Malla (1641–1674) had a prophetic vision. In the vision it was claimed that the king was cursed. If he would visit then they would die prematurely. This vision resulted in him believing that the kings of Nepal would die if they visited the Budhanilkantha Temple. Royal family members including the Nepalese monarchs after King Pratap Malla never visited the Temple in fear of the prophecy.

Floating Statue 

It was suggested for many years that the statue floats in the pool. Indeed, limited access to scientific rigour in 1957 failed to confirm or refute the claim but a small chip of the statue did confirm it to be silica-based stone but with a remarkably low density similar to lava rock.

Origin of the statue 

According to one story, a farmer and his wife once struck a figure while plowing the field, which caused it to start flowing blood from the figure into the ground. The idol was later placed in its current position.

Mirror Image 
Local legend describes the existence of mirror-like image of Lord Shiva beside the statue in the water even though the statue faces upward towards the sky. The legends also claims that the mirror like image is seen on annual Shiva festival held every year in August.

See also
List of Hindu temples in Nepal

References

Hindu temples in Kathmandu District
Kathmandu District
Vishnu temples in Nepal